Llandudno is a seaside resort, town and community in Conwy County Borough, Wales, located on the Creuddyn peninsula, which protrudes into the Irish Sea. In the 2011 UK census, the community – which includes Gogarth, Penrhyn Bay, Craigside, Glanwydden, Penrhynside, and Bryn Pydew – had a population of 20,701. The town's name means "Church of Saint Tudno".

Llandudno is the largest seaside resort in Wales, and as early as 1861 was being called 'the Queen of the Welsh Watering Places' (a phrase later also used in connection with Tenby and Aberystwyth; the word 'resort' came a little later). Historically a part of Caernarfonshire, Llandudno was formerly in the district of Aberconwy within Gwynedd.

History

The town of Llandudno developed from Stone Age, Bronze Age and Iron Age settlements over many hundreds of years on the slopes of the limestone headland, known to seafarers as the Great Orme and to landsmen as the Creuddyn Peninsula. The origins in recorded history are with the Manor of Gogarth conveyed by King Edward I to Annan, Bishop of Bangor in 1284. The manor comprised three townships, Y Gogarth in the south-west, Y Cyngreawdr in the north (with the parish church of St Tudno) and Yr Wyddfid in the south-east.

Modern Llandudno takes its name from the ancient parish of Saint Tudno but also encompasses several neighbouring townships and districts including Craig-y-Don, Llanrhos and Penrhyn Bay. Also nearby is the small town and marina of Deganwy and these last four are in the traditional parish of Llanrhos. The ancient geographical boundaries of the Llandudno area are complex: although they are on the eastern side of the River Conwy (the natural boundary between north-west and north-east Wales), the ancient parishes of Llandudno, Llanrhos and Llangystennin (which includes Llandudno Junction) were in the medieval commote of Creuddyn in the Kingdom of Gwynedd, and afterwards part of Caernarfonshire. Today, Deganwy and Llandudno Junction are part of the town community of Conwy even though they are across the river and only linked to Conwy by a causeway and bridge.

Great Orme

Mostly owned by Mostyn Estates, the Great Orme is home to several large herds of wild Kashmiri goats originally descended from a pair given by Queen Victoria to Lord Mostyn. These goats are also known to frequently roam the main streets of Llandudno. The summit of the Great Orme stands at 679 feet (207 m). The Summit Hotel, now a tourist attraction, was once the home of world middleweight champion boxer Randolph Turpin.

The limestone headland is a haven for flora and fauna, with some rare species such as peregrine falcons and a species of wild cotoneaster (cambricus) which can only be found on the Great Orme. The sheer limestone cliffs provide ideal nesting conditions for a wide variety of sea birds, including cormorants, shags, guillemots, razorbills, puffins, kittiwakes, fulmars and numerous gulls.

There are several attractions including the Great Orme Tramway and the Llandudno Cable Car that takes tourists to the summit. The Great Orme also has the longest toboggan run in Britain at 750m long.

Development

By 1847 the town had grown to a thousand people, served by the new church of St George, built in 1840. The great majority of the men worked in the copper mines, with others employed in fishing and subsistence agriculture.

In 1848, Owen Williams, an architect and surveyor from Liverpool, presented Lord Mostyn with plans to develop the marshlands behind Llandudno Bay as a holiday resort. These were enthusiastically pursued by Lord Mostyn. The influence of the Mostyn Estate and its agents over the years was paramount in the development of Llandudno, especially after the appointment of George Felton as surveyor and architect in 1857. Between 1857 and 1877 much of central Llandudno was developed under Felton's supervision. Felton also undertook architectural design work, including the design and execution of Holy Trinity Church in Mostyn Street.

Transport

The town is just off the North Wales Coast railway line which was opened as the Chester and Holyhead Railway in 1848. It became part of the London and North Western Railway in 1859, and part of the London, Midland and Scottish Railway in 1923. Llandudno was specifically built as a mid-Victorian era holiday destination and is served by a branch railway line opened in 1858 from Llandudno Junction with stations at Deganwy and Llandudno. The town is also served by Arriva Buses Wales, with services to Rhyl, Bangor, Caernarfon and The Great Orme Summit. Also there is Llew Jones with services to Betws-y-coed and Llanrwst.

Trams
The Great Orme Tramway runs from the center of the town to the summit of the Great Orme and is Great Britain's only remaining cable-operated street tramway.

The former Llandudno and Colwyn Bay Electric Railway operated an electric tramway service between Llandudno and Rhos-on-Sea from 1907, this being extended to Colwyn Bay in 1908. The service closed in 1956. In Llandudno the original Tramway went up the middle of Gloddaeth Street and down the North Shore, through Penrhyn Bay and across to Colwyn Bay.

Attractions

Llandudno Bay and the North Shore

For most of the length of Llandudno's North Shore there is a wide curving Victorian promenade. The road, collectively known as The Parade, has a different name for each block and it is on these parades and crescents that many of Llandudno's hotels are built. The North Wales Theatre, Arena and Conference Centre, built in 1994, and extended in 2006 and renamed "Venue Cymru" is located near the centre of the bay.

Llandudno Pier

The Llandudno Pier is on the North Shore. Built in 1877, it is a Grade II listed building. The pier was extended in 1884 in a landward direction along the side of what was the Baths Hotel (where the Grand Hotel now stands).

Happy Valley and Haulfre Gardens
The Happy Valley, a former quarry, was the gift of Lord Mostyn to the town in celebration of the Golden Jubilee of Queen Victoria in 1887. The area was landscaped and developed as gardens, two miniature golf courses, a putting green, a popular open-air theatre and extensive lawns. The ceremonies connected with the Welsh National Eisteddfod were held there in 1896 and again in 1963. The gardens are listed at Grade II on the Cadw/ICOMOS Register of Parks and Gardens of Special Historic Interest in Wales.

Haulfre Gardens were developed as the private gardens to a house, Sunny Hill, in the north-west of the town. Later acquired by the council, they were opened as a public park in 1929, the opening ceremony being conducted by David Lloyd George. The gardens are listed Grade II on the Cadw/ICOMOS register.

Marine Drive
The first route round the perimeter of the Great Orme was a footpath constructed in 1858 by Reginald Cust, a trustee of the Mostyn Estate. In 1872 the Great Ormes Head Marine Drive Co. Ltd. was formed to turn the path into a carriage road. Following bankruptcy, a second company completed the road in 1878. The contractors for the scheme were Messrs Hughes, Morris, Davies, a consortium led by Richard Hughes of Madoc Street, Llandudno. The road was bought by Llandudno Urban District Council in 1897. The  one-way drive starts at the foot of the Happy Valley. After about  a side road leads to St. Tudno's Church, the Great Orme Bronze Age Copper Mine and the summit of the Great Orme. Continuing on the Marine Drive the Great Orme Lighthouse (now a small hotel) is passed, and, shortly afterwards on the right, the Rest and Be Thankful Cafe and information centre. Below the Marine Drive at its western end is the site of the wartime Coast Artillery School (1940–1945), now a scheduled ancient monument.

West Shore
The West Shore is a quiet beach on the estuary of the River Conwy. It was here at Pen Morfa that Alice Liddell (of Alice in Wonderland fame) spent the long summer holidays of her childhood.

Mostyn Street
Running behind the promenade is Mostyn Street leading to Mostyn Broadway and then Mostyn Avenue. These are the main shopping streets of Llandudno and Craig-y-Don. Mostyn Street accommodates the high street shops, the major high street banks and building societies, two churches, amusement arcades and the town's public library. The last is the starting point for the Llandudno Town Trail.

Victorian Extravaganza

Every year in May bank holiday weekend, Llandudno has a three-day Victorian Carnival and Mostyn Street becomes a funfair. Madoc Street and Gloddaeth Street and the Promenade become part of the route each day of a mid-day carnival parade. The Bodafon Farm fields become the location of a Festival of Transport.

Llandudno Lifeboat

Until 2017, Llandudno was unique within the United Kingdom in that its lifeboat station was located inland, allowing it to launch with equal facility from either the West Shore or the North Shore as needed. In 2017, a new lifeboat station was completed, and new, high-speed, offshore and inshore lifeboats, and a modern launching system, were acquired.  This station is close to the paddling pool on North Shore.
Llandudno's active volunteer crews are called out more than ever with the rapidly increasing numbers of small pleasure craft sailing in coastal waters. The Llandudno Lifeboat is normally on display on the promenade every Sunday and bank holiday Monday from May until October.

Places of worship
The ancient parish church dedicated to Saint Tudno stands in a hollow near the northern point of the Great Orme and two miles (3 km) from the present town. It was established as an oratory by Tudno, a 6th-century monk, but the present church dates from the 12th century and it is still used on summer Sunday mornings. It was the Anglican parish church of Llandudno until that status was transferred first to St George's (now closed) and later to Holy Trinity Church in Mostyn Street.

The principal Christian Churches of Llandudno are members of Cytûn (churches together) and include the Church in Wales (Holy Trinity and also Saint Paul's at Craig-y-Don), the Roman Catholic Church of Our Lady Star of the Sea, Saint John's Methodist Church, Gloddaeth United Church (Presbyterian), Assemblies of God (Pentecostal), Llandudno Baptist Church, St. David's Methodist Church at Craig-y-Don, the Coptic Orthodox Church of Saint Mary and Saint Abasikhiron, and Eglwys Unedig Gymraeg Llandudno (the United Welsh Church of Llandudno). There is also a Christadelphian meeting hall in the town.

A member of the local Methodist community is Roger Roberts, now Lord Roberts of Llandudno, Liberal Democrat Spokesman for International Development in the House of Lords.

Llandudno is home to a Jewish centre in Church Walks, which serves the local Jewish population – one of few in North Wales. There is also a Buddhist centre, Kalpa Bhadra, on Mostyn Avenue in Craig-y-Don.

Sports
The town is host to Llandudno F.C. who currently compete in the Cymru North, the second tier of Welsh football, but the team have previously competed in the top level Cymru Premier. The club plays home matches at Maesdu Park and competed in the Europa League in 2016.

The town is also host to Llandudno Albion, who currently play in the third tier of Welsh football, and Llandudno Amateurs, who play in the fourth tier.

Football in Llandudno dates back to 1878 when a club known as Gloddaeth Rovers for around a decade. Gloddaeth Rovers were then replaced by Llandudno Swifts as the towns main club. Following the demise of Swifts in 1901, a new club, Llandudno Amateurs were formed.

A football club is mentioned in Llandudno as far back as 1865.

Llandudno Rugby Club also plays in the town and was established in 1952.

There are also local pool, snooker and domino tournaments.

Demography 
The 2011 census counted 20,701 usual residents of which 50.8% were born in Wales and 40.7% in England.

Governance

There are two tiers of local government covering Llandudno, at community (town) level and principal area (county borough) level: Llandudno Town Council and Conwy County Borough Council. Llandudno is now divided into five electoral wards: Craig-y-Don, Gogarth, Mostyn, Penrhyn and Tudno. The wards elect county councillors to Conwy County Borough Council and four community councillors each to Llandudno Town Council.

Administrative history
In 1854 Llandudno was made an Improvement Commissioners District. The district covered part of the ancient parish of Llandudno and part of the neighbouring parish of Eglwysrhos. In 1894 the improvement commissioners were replaced by Llandudno Urban District Council. This was a lower-tier council, with Caernarfonshire County Council providing county-level services. The urban district council built Llandudno Town Hall to serve as its headquarters in 1902. In 1974 the urban district was abolished, with the area becoming a community within the Aberconwy district in the new county of Gwynedd. Further local government reform in 1996 saw the area become part of the principal area of Conwy County Borough.

Llandudno falls under the UK parliamentary constituency of Aberconwy, whose MP is the Conservative Robin Millar, and the Senedd constituency of Aberconwy, whose MS is the Conservative Janet Finch-Saunders.  It falls under the North Wales electoral region.

Links with Wormhout and Mametz

Llandudno is twinned with the Flemish town of Wormhout  from Dunkirk. It was there that many members of the Llandudno-based 69th Territorial Regiment were ambushed and taken prisoner. Later, at nearby Esquelbecq on 28 May 1940, the prisoners were shot.

The 1st (North Wales) Brigade was headquartered in Llandudno in December 1914 and included a battalion of the Royal Welch Fusiliers, which had been raised and trained in Llandudno. During the 1914–18 war this Brigade, a major part of the 38th Welsh Division, took part in the Battle of the Somme and the Brigade was ordered to take Mametz Wood. Two days of fighting brought about the total destruction of Mametz village by shelling. After the war, the people of Llandudno (including returning survivors from the 38th Welsh Division) contributed generously to the fund for the reconstruction of the village of Mametz.

Cultural connections

Llandudno hosted the Welsh National Eisteddfod in 1864, 1896 and 1963, and in 2008 welcomed the Urdd National Eisteddfod to Gloddaeth Isaf Farm, Penrhyn Bay. The town also hosted the Liverpool Olympic Festival in 1865 and 1866.

Matthew Arnold gives a vivid and lengthy description of 1860s Llandudno – and of the ancient tales of Taliesin and Maelgwn Gwynedd that are associated with the local landscape – in the first sections of the preface to On the Study of Celtic Literature (1867). It is also used as a location for dramatic scenes in the stage play and film Hindle Wakes by Stanley Houghton, and the 1911 novel, The Card, by Arnold Bennett, and its subsequent film version.

Elisabeth of Wied, the Queen Consort of Romania and also known as writer Carmen Sylva, stayed in Llandudno for five weeks in 1890. On leaving, she described Wales as "a beautiful haven of peace". Translated into Welsh as "hardd, hafan, hedd", it became the town's official motto.

Other famous people with links to Llandudno include the Victorian statesman John Bright and multi-capped Welsh international footballers Neville Southall, Neil Eardley , Chris Maxwell and Joey Jones. Australia's 7th Prime Minister Billy Hughes attended school in Llandudno. Gordon Borrie QC (Baron Borrie), Director General of the Office of Fair Trading from 1976 to 1992, was educated at the town's John Bright Grammar School when he lived there as a wartime evacuee.

The international art gallery Oriel Mostyn is in Vaughan Street next to the post office. It was built in 1901 to house the art collection of Lady Augusta Mostyn. It was requisitioned in 1914 for use as an army drill hall and later became a warehouse, before being returned to use as an art gallery in 1979. Following a major revamp the gallery was renamed simply 'Mostyn' in 2010.

Llandudno has its own mini arts festival 'LLAWN' (Llandudno Arts Weekend) which has been running for the past three years (LLAWN01 −2013, LLAWN02 – 2014, LLAWN03 – 2015). LLAWN is a mini festival that rediscovers and celebrates Llandudno’s past in rather a unique way; via art, architecture, artefact, sound, performance, and participation. The festival takes place over three days of the weekend in late September, originally conceived as a way to promote what those in the hospitality sector refer to as the ‘shoulder season’, which means a lull in the tourist calendar.  The festival is supported by Arts Council Wales, Mostyn Estates, Conwy County Borough Council, MOSTYN and Llandudno Town Council.

Notable people
See :Category:People from Llandudno 

 Augusta Mostyn (1830–1912) philanthropist and photographer, lived in Gloddaeth Hall
 Martha Hughes Cannon (1857–1932) a Utah State Senator, physician, women's rights advocate and suffragist
 Dion Fortune (1890–1946) occultist, ceremonial magician, novelist and author.
 Margaret Lacey (1911–1988) character actress and ballet teacher.
 Sylvia Sleigh (1916–2010) naturalised American realist painter, worked in New York City
 Peter Brinson (1920–1995) writer and lecturer on dance.
 Jeremy Brooks (1926–1994) novelist, poet and dramatist, evacuated to Llandudno.
 Roger Roberts, Baron Roberts of Llandudno (born 1935) politician & Methodist minister. 
 Ben Johnson (born 1946) painter of detailed cityscapes
 Billy Bibby & The Wry Smiles, rock band formed in 2015 around Llandudno.

Sport 
 Joey Jones (born 1955) football full-back with 594 club caps and 72 for Wales
 Neville Southall (born 1958) footballer with 710 club caps and 92 for Wales
 Neal Eardley (born 1988) footballer with over 400 club caps and 16 for Wales

Freedom of the Town
The following people and military units have received the Freedom of the Town of Llandudno.

Individuals
 Neville Southall : September 1993.
 Councillor Philip Evans JP: January 2002
 Terence Davies: 16 April 2018.

Military Units
 RAF Valley: September 1995.
 Llandudno Lifeboat Station, RNLI: January 2002.
 203 (Welsh) Field Hospital (Volunteers) RAMC: 19 September 2009.

References

Bibliography
 Ivor Wynne Jones. Llandudno Queen of Welsh Resorts Landmark, Ashbourne Derbyshire 2002 
 Philip C. Evans. "Llandudno Coast Artillery School" Llandudno Town Council 2011

External links

 
 A Vision of Britain Through Time
 British Listed Buildings
 Genuki
 Geograph
 Office for National Statistics

 
Towns in Conwy County Borough
Principal areas of Wales
Populated coastal places in Wales
Registered historic parks and gardens in Conwy County Borough